Alsomitra is a genus of the plant family Cucurbitaceae (the cucumber, squash, and pumpkin family).

The seeds of Alsomitra macrocarpa are among the largest winged seeds in the plant kingdom and their shape inspired a number of aviation pioneers.

Selected species
Alsomitra angulata
Alsomitra angustipetala
Alsomitra balansae
Alsomitra beccariana
Alsomitra brasiliensis
Alsomitra capricornica
Alsomitra macrocarpa - Javan cucumber

References

External links
Wind dispersal of seeds
Alsomitra macrocarpa seed
 Andres, T. C. 2004. Web site for the plant family Cucurbitaceae & home of The Cucurbit Network.
 KBD: Kew Bibliographic Databases of Royal Botanic Gardens, Kew. 
Species list
BBC - Vine seeds become 'giant gliders'

Cucurbitaceae genera
Cucurbitaceae
Taxa named by Carl Linnaeus